Attorney General Henderson may refer to:

Alexander Henderson (Canadian politician) (1860–1940), Attorneys General of British Columbia
Paul Henderson (politician) (born 1962), Attorneys-General of the Northern Territory

See also
General Henderson (disambiguation)